Gaetano Negri (July 11, 1838 – July 31, 1902) was an Italian geologist, writer and politician. He was the 3rd mayor of Milan. He served in the Chamber of Deputies of the Kingdom of Italy.

References

External links
 

1838 births
1902 deaths
19th-century Italian writers
19th-century male writers
Mayors of Milan
19th-century Italian geologists
Deputies of Legislature XIV of the Kingdom of Italy